This is a list of fictional male detective characters from novels, short stories, radio, television, and films.

A
Detective Chief-Inspector Roderick Alleyn, by Ngaio Marsh
Jonathan Ames, Bored to Death: A Noir-otic Story by Jonathan Ames
 Arjun, by Samaresh Majumdar

B
Byomkesh Bakshi, by Sharadindu Bandyopadhyay
Goenda Baradacharan, by Shirshendu Mukhopadhyay
Cyrus Barker by Will Thomas
Parashor Barma, by Premendra Mitra
John Barnaby, Midsummer Murders
Tom Barnaby, Midsummer Murders
Red Barry, Red Barry
P. K. Basu, by Narayan Sanyal
Martin Beck, by Sjöwall and Wahlöö
Ambrose Bierce, by Oakley Hall
Blacksad, by Juan Díaz Canales and Juanjo Guarnido
Detective Inspector Napoleon "Bony" Bonaparte, by Arthur Upfield
FBI Agent Seeley Booth, Bones, by Kathy Reichs
Harry Bosch, by Michael Connelly
Slam Bradley, Slam Bradley
Father Brown, by G. K. Chesterton
Romeo Brown, Romeo Brown
Detective Sammy Bryant, Southland

C
Brother Cadfael, The Cadfael Chronicles by Ellis Peters
Rick Cahill, Yesterday's Echo by Matt Coyle
Lieutenant Horatio Caine, CSI: Miami
Slim Callaghan, by Peter Cheyney
Vincent Calvino, by Christopher G. Moore
Albert Campion, by Margery Allingham	
Inspector Canardo, Canardo
Frank Cannon, Cannon
Nick Carter, Nick Carter
Henri Cassin, So Dark the Night
Charlie Chan, by Earl Derr Biggers
Nick Charles, The Thin Man by Dashiell Hammett
Dipak Chatterjee, by Samarendranath Pandey
Clifton, by Raymond Macherot and later authors
Inspector Clouseau, The Pink Panther
Rustin Cohle, True Detective by Nic Pizzolatto
Elvis Cole, by Robert Crais
Lieutenant Columbo, Columbo
FBI Special Agent Dale Cooper, Twin Peaks
Michael Cordero, Jane the Virgin
Carland Cross, Carland Cross.
Mateo Cruz, BAU Section Chief, Criminal Minds

D
Dr. Phil D'Amato, by Paul Levinson
Harry D'Amour, by Clive Barker 
Adam Dalgliesh, by P. D. James
Detective Superintendent Andy Dalziel, Dalziel and Pascoe by Reginald Hill 
Lieutenant Cedric Daniels, The Wire
Shabor Dasgupta, by Shirshendu Mukhopadhyay
Lucas Davenport, by John Sandford
Peter Decker, by Faye Kellerman
Judge Dee, by Robert van Gulik
Alex Delaware, by Jonathan Kellerman
Harry Devlin, by Martin Edwards
Mike Dime, by Barry Fantoni
Dylan Dog, by Tiziano Sclavi
Harry Dresden, The Dresden Files by Jim Butcher
Dan Dunn, by Norman W. Marsh
Nathaniel Dusk, (DC Comics)

E
Eken Babu, by Sujan Dasgupta

F
Marcus Didius Falco, by Lindsey Davis
Erast Fandorin, by Boris Akunin
Dr. Gideon Fell, by John Dickson Carr
Feluda, by Satyajit Ray
Detective Don Flack, CSI: NY
Detective Inspector Malcolm Fox, by Ian Rankin

G
Detective Sergeant David Gabriel, The Closer
Inspector Gadget, Inspector Gadget
Commander George Gideon, by John Creasey 
Pandab Goenda, by Sasthipada Chattopadhyay
Gogol, by Samaresh Basu
Gordianus the Finder, by Steven Saylor
Detective Inspector Alan Grant, by Josephine Tey
Inspector Gregson, by Sir Arthur Conan Doyle
Inspector Goole, An Inspector Calls

H
Healer, played by Ji Chang-wook
Mike Hammer, by Mickey Spillane
Hanpei Hattori, Kikaider, by Shotaro Ishinomori
Heiji Hattori, by Gosho Aoyama
Hawkshaw, Hawkshaw the Detective
Wayne Hays, True Detective, by Nic Pizzolato
Shotaro Hidari, Kamen Rider W
Ric Hochet, Ric Hochet
Harry Hole, by Jo Nesbø
Sherlock Holmes, by Sir Arthur Conan Doyle
Somerset Holmes, Somerset Holmes
Aaron Hotchner, BAU unit chief, Criminal Minds

J
Barnaby Jones, Barnaby Jones
Gil Jourdan, Gil Jourdan
Athelney Jones, by Sir Arthur Conan Doyle
Jack Brady, by Danielle Ramsay
James Bond, Ian Flemming

K
Kakababu, by Sunil Gangopadhyay
Martin Kane, Martin Kane, Private Eye
Julian Kestrel, by Kate Ross
Rip Kirby, Rip Kirby
Nick Knatterton, Nick Knatterton.
Detective Lieutenant Theo Kojak, Kojak
Detective Vince Korsak, Rizzoli & Isles
Shinichi Kudo, Case Closed

L
L Lawliet, Death Note
Thomas Lynley, by Elizabeth George
Inspector Lestrade, by Sir Arthur Conan Doyle

M
Constable Hamish Macbeth, by Marion Chesney
Detective Vic Mackey, The Shield
Thomas Magnum, Magnum, P.I.
Jules Maigret, by Georges Simenon
Joe Mannix, Mannix
Philip Marlowe, by Raymond Chandler
Perry Mason, by Erle Stanley Gardner
Angus McDonald, The Adventure Zone
Travis McGee, by John D. MacDonald
Detective Jimmy McNulty, The Wire
Sir Henry Merrivale, by Carter Dickson
Prodosh C. Mitter, (aka Feluda) by Satyajit Ray
Adrian Monk, Monk
Richard Moore/Kogoro Mori, by Gosho Aoyama
Derek Morgan, Criminal Minds
Inspector Morse, by Colin Dexter
Bhaduri Moshai, by Nirendranath Chakraborty
FBI Special Agent Fox Mulder, The X-Files
Bangladesh Counter Intelligence Masud Rana, Masud Rana
Mouri Kogorou, Case Closed
Inspector Juzo Megure, Case Closed
Detective William Murdoch, Murdoch Mysteries
Inspectore Montalbano

N
Sokichi Narumi, Kamen Rider W
 Detective Zack Nichols, Law & Order: Criminal Intent
 Bogey Nicholson, Bogey

P
Detective Sergeant Peter Pascoe, Dalziel and Pascoe by Reginald Hill 
Hercule Poirot, by Agatha Christie
Bernard Prince, Bernard Prince
Detective Lieutenant Louie Provenza, The Closer
Jake Peralta (Brooklyn Nine-Nine)
Problem Sleuth (Problem Sleuth)

Q
Ellery Queen, The Adventures of Ellery Queen

R
Jack Reacher, by Lee Child
Detective Danny Reagan, Blue Bloods
Detective Inspector John Rebus, by Ian Rankin
Spencer Reid, Criminal Minds
Arkady Renko, of the Moscow Militsya, by Martin Cruz Smith
Dave Robicheaux, by James Lee Burke
 Detective Inspector Jack Robinson, Miss Fisher's Murder Mysteries
Jim Rockford, The Rockford Files
Lincoln Rhyme, by Jeffery Deaver
David Rossi, Unit Senior Agent, Criminal Minds
Kiriti Roy, by Dr. Nihar Ranjan Gupta

S
Sakkarbaar by Gunvantrai Acharya
Colonel Niladri Sarkar by Syed Mustafa Siraj
Michael Shayne, by Brett Halliday
Dan Shepherd, by Stephen Leather
Sergeant Andy Sipowicz, NYPD Blue
Sam Spade, by Dashiell Hammett
Lance Spearman, in African Film magazine
 Doctor Spektor, Doctor Spektor
Shawn Spencer, Psych
Spenser, by Robert B. Parker
Detective Elliot Stabler, Law & Order: Special Victims Unit
Nigel Strangeways, by Cecil Day-Lewis
 Professor John Stubbs, by Ruthven Todd
Detective Matthew Scudder, by Lawrence Block
Shuichi Saihara, Danganronpa V3: Killing Harmony

T
Goenda Tatar, by Sasthipada Chattopadhyay
Tif, Tif et Tondu
Detective Inspector Tom Thorne, by Mark Billingham
Tondu, Tif et Tondu
Philip Trent, by E. C. BentleyDetective David Tapp, by James Wan and Leigh Whannell

V
Detective Van Zwam, The Adventures of NeroPhilo Vance, by S. S. Van Dine
Nick Valentine, Fallout 4W
Inspector Kurt Wallander, by Henning Mankell
Dr. John Watson, by Sir Arthur Conan Doyle
Chief Inspector Reginald Wexford, by Ruth Rendell
Lord Peter Wimsey, by Dorothy L. Sayers
Nero Wolfe, by Rex Stout

Y
 Inspector Jugo Yokomizo, Detective Conan
 Inspector Sango Yokomizo, Detective Conan
 Inspector Misao Yamamura, Detective Conan

Z

 Inspector Koichi Zenigata, Lupin III'', by Monkey Punch

See also
 Crime fiction
 Detective fiction
 Lists of authors
 List of female detective characters
 List of fictional detective teams
 List of mystery writers
 List of thriller authors
 Mystery fiction
 Whodunit

External links
 "Top 10 Fictional Detectives"
 "Television's Most Memorable Male Detectives of all Time"

Male
Detectives